Local elections were held in Cabuyao on May 13, 2013 within the Philippine general election. The total number of voters registered in the City of Cabuyao is 135,713 in 586 voting precincts. The voters elected for the elective local posts in the city: the mayor, vice mayor, and ten councilors.

Cabuyao is a newly created city in the province of Laguna by virtue of Republic Act No. 10163 or the "Charter of the City of Cabuyao" ratified on August 4, 2012 by its people. Voters will no longer vote for eight councilors but they will elect ten city councilors as prescribed in the charter.

Overview
Incumbent Mayor Isidro "Jun" L. Hemedes Jr. decided to run for re-election under the Nacionalista Party, he was elected as Mayor since 2007 after defeating former Mayor Proceso "Etok" Aguillo in 2007 local elections. His opponent was former Mayor Nila Aguillo, the wife of Etok Aguillo, she is under the Liberal Party.

Hemedes' running mate is the incumbent Vice-Mayor Rommel "Mel" Gecolea. His opponent is city councilor Maria Wanda Alimagno, the running mate of Nila Aguillo.

Each team had their own set of ten candidates for city council. Nacionalista Party/Administration team was composed of five re-election candidates, Barangay Pulo Chairman Odilon I. Caparas and Barangay Marinig Chairman Emiliano T. Lirio and three other candidates. Under the Liberal Party/Opposition team were two re-election candidates, former vice-mayor Benjamin C. del Rosario, Barangay Sala Chairman Amelito G. Alimagno, Barangay Mamatid Councilor Gabriel Bariring. Notable candidates for Cabuyao City Council were Anna Liza Baldonado or popularly known as "Milagring" of the defunct TV program Wowowee and 6 Cycle Mind lead vocalist Tutti Caringal.

Candidates

Results

Mayoral elections
The candidates for mayor with the highest number of votes wins the seat; they are voted separately, therefore, they may be of different parties when elected.

Vice-mayoral elections
The candidates for Vice-mayor with the highest number of votes wins the seat; they are voted separately, therefore, they may be of different parties when elected.

City Council Elections

Voters elected ten councilors to comprise the City Council or the Sangguniang Panlungsod. Candidates were voted separately so there are chances where winning candidates will have unequal number of votes and may come from different political parties. The ten candidates with the highest number of votes win the seats.

 
 
 
 
 
 
 
 
 
 
|-
|bgcolor=black colspan=5|

References

External links
COMELEC - 2013 Election Results
Official website of the City of Cabuyao
Official website of the Commission on Elections
 Official website of National Movement for Free Elections (NAMFREL)
Official website of the Parish Pastoral Council for Responsible Voting (PPCRV)

2013 Philippine local elections
Elections in Cabuyao
2013 elections in Calabarzon